Lesbian pulp fiction is a genre of lesbian literature that refers to any mid-20th century paperback novel or pulp magazine with overtly lesbian themes and content. Lesbian pulp fiction was published in the 1950s and 1960s by many of the same paperback publishing houses as other genres of fiction, including westerns, romances, and detective fiction. Because very little other literature was available for and about lesbians at this time, quite often these books were the only reference the public (lesbian and otherwise) had for modeling what lesbians were. English professor Stephanie Foote commented on the importance of lesbian pulp novels to the lesbian identity prior to the rise of organized feminism: "Pulps have been understood as signs of a secret history of readers, and they have been valued because they have been read. The more they are read, the more they are valued, and the more they are read, the closer the relationship between the very act of circulation and reading and the construction of a lesbian community becomes…. Characters use the reading of novels as a way to understand that they are not alone."

These books were sold at drugstores, magazine stands, bus terminals and other places where one might look to purchase cheap, consumable entertainment. The books were small enough to fit in a purse or back pocket (hence both the brand-name and the generalized term "pocket books") and cheap enough to throw away when the reader was through with them.

Development of the genre

In the early to mid-20th century, only a handful of books were published that addressed lesbians as characters in relationships with women.  Those notable novels were published in hardcover and were as follows:

We Too Are Drifting  (1935) Gale Wilhelm, Random House
Pity for Women (1937) Helen Anderson, Doubleday 
Torchlight to Valhalla (1938, later titled The Strange Path when reissued in paperback in 1953) Gale Wilhem, Random House

During World War II, the military distributed small paperbacks to its forces, causing a large population of Americans to become accustomed to having access to cheap books and thus creating a demand for the same easy access to reading material when the soldiers returned home. As a result, in the years after the war, there appeared a new and often subversive trend in publishing that allowed for books to be written, cheaply produced, and widely distributed using technology previously unavailable. These books were dubbed "pulp" fiction because they were inexpensive and usually sensational or low-brow, much like the "pulp" magazines of the first half of the 20th century. Pulps were not necessarily "low brow." Many pulp authors are now celebrated with commemorative hardcover editions.  These mass market paperbacks, printed and bound on cheap paper, often addressed "dirty" topics like drugs, gangs, white slavery, crime, murder, and homosexuality. Because the literature was not respected, it was not censored as readily, although most of the larger paperback publishers were wary of postal censorship, and, for instance, took care not to publish works that were overly supportive of "deviant" lifestyles. In terms of lesbian fiction, these books were the only ones available in many locations to people who had no previous access to information or stories that involved lesbian characters.

Several publishing houses created special imprints, such as Fawcett's "Gold Medal" division, to satisfy the demand for pulp fiction. Unlike many publishers, Fawcett made a point of publishing lesbian pulp written by lesbians, or sometimes by heterosexual women, rather than by heterosexual men. It made a significant contribution to the lesbian community to have lesbian authors writing more or less authentic stories about what it was like to be a lesbian, as opposed to only having heterosexual men writing stories about lesbians for the titillation of other men.

Hundreds of lesbian pulp titles were published between 1950 and 1969, and millions of copies of each title were often were sold. This was part of no social agenda on the publishers' parts: they were making quite a bit of money. However prevalent the books were, purchasing and reading them for many women was the equivalent to coming out to the cashier. Author Joan Nestle called them  "survival books" and described purchasing them: The act of taking one of these books off the drugstore rack and paying for it at the counter was a frightening and difficult move for most women. This was especially true during the atmosphere of the McCarthy trials...Although tame by today's standards...these volumes were so threatening then that women hid them, burnt them, and threw them out.

Women's Barracks 

The first paperback to address a lesbian relationship was published as early as 1950 with Women's Barracks by Tereska Torrès, published by Gold Medal Books. The story was a fictionalized account of Torres' experiences in the Free French Forces in London during World War II. Women's Barracks sold 4 million copies and was selected in 1952 to become an example of how paperback books were promoting moral degeneracy by the House Select Committee on Current Pornographic Materials. The Committee concluded their investigation with a report that required publishers to conform to certain moral standards in the content and publicizing of their books, or else face fines or imprisonment. As a result, authors were forced to limit their stories to fit these requirements. However, as the decade went on, publishers became bolder in printing material that might be judged as immoral.

Spring Fire and the establishment of a formula 

Accounting for the success of Women's Barracks, it is not a coincidence that Gold Medal Books published another paperback with lesbian themes, and in fact, eventually published some of the least homophobic books in the genre.

Spring Fire, by Marijane Meaker writing as Vin Packer, is generally considered to be the first lesbian paperback novel, since the plot focused on the relationship of the two main characters, as opposed to the various relationships examined in Women's Barracks. It is also the first modern lesbian novel written by a lesbian. Spring Fire, which was published by Gold Medal Books in 1952 and sold more than 1.5 million copies, is about two college girls, Mitch and Leda, who fall in love and have an affair. Spring Fire inspired one of the best-known authors of lesbian pulp, Ann Bannon. Bannon wrote to Meaker after reading the novel, and Meaker convinced her to submit her own manuscript to Gold Medal Books for publication in the genre.

The tragic endings of Women's Barracks and Spring Fire (suicide and insanity) are typical of lesbian pulp novels. Meaker was told by her editor that because the books traveled through the mail and anything sent through the U.S. Postal Service was subject to government censorship, publishers had to make sure that the books seemed in no way to proselytize homosexuality. No character was allowed to be both homosexual and happy at the story's end. A character had either to turn heterosexual and end up coupled with a man or, if she remained homosexual, suffer death, insanity or some equally unappealing fate.

The first exception to this formula, and technically not a pulp fiction, is the 1952 romance novel The Price of Salt by Patricia Highsmith, published in hardcover by Coward-McCann under the pseudonym of "Claire Morgan". It was republished in 1953 as a Bantam Books lesbian pulp fiction paperback. Throughout the genre, satisfactory endings for women who accepted their homosexuality were rare.

However, some authors defied the tragic endings. Ann Bannon published six lesbian novels between 1957 and 1962, a series known as the Beebo Brinker Chronicles. Bannon's novels ended happily, which changed the societal perception of lesbianism. Rather than being seen as "neurotic, frigid, immature, and even psychotic", lesbians were viewed as warm and loving. Bannon's novels paved the way for social acceptance of lesbianism and the queer sexual revolution.

Content
Content and quality of the books varied widely. Writer Yvonne Keller divides books within the lesbian pulp fiction genre into subclasses she labels "pro-lesbian" and "virile adventures". Pro-lesbian paperbacks were generally about and by women, featured a love story between women, had fairly well-developed characters, and tended not to feature gratuitous or graphic sexual encounters. Virile adventures were more male centered, perhaps with at least one male main character, and featured graphic depictions of sex. Author Paula Christian described her inspiration to write during this period: "Contemporary fiction showed such instability, violence, and sensationalism...I simply wanted to show the other side."

However, the majority of books in the lesbian paperback fiction genre promoted myths about lesbians and lesbianism. Women who are left without men can be seduced and violated by predatory lesbians (usually butch women). The depictions of lesbianism in prison, the military, and boarding schools was a well-used motif. Lesbianism was often linked to other topics that were seen as salacious or shocking at the time: witchcraft, Satanism, bondage and discipline, orgies, and voyeurism. Many "lesbian" pulps actually depict characters who may now be read as bisexual and who end up in heterosexual relationships at the end of their stories. During this time, however, bisexuality was seen less as a permanent identity and more as a stepping-stone to homosexuality or to various forms of sexual promiscuity.

The vast majority of characters in lesbian pulp were white. Rea Michaels, writer of novels including Cloak of Evil and Duet in Darkness, stands out as one of the few pulp authors to include people of color and interracial relationships in her books and to have representations of lesbians of color on the covers of her novels.

Barbara Grier, who started Naiad Press, called the years between 1950 and 1965 the "Golden Age of Lesbian Pulp Fiction". Grier republished many of the books in this span in the 1980s under Naiad, and Cleis Press and Feminist Press have again reissued them. Several writers of this "Golden Age" stood out for their contributions to gay and lesbian literature and their formation of a lesbian identity prior to the advent of feminism.

Authors 
Authors of lesbian paperbacks were both male and female, and often used pseudonyms – the male authors frequently used female names. One retrospective summed up the genre as, "The vast majority of these lesbian novels were written by men, designed to fulfill straight men's fantasies...But perhaps 40 or 50 lesbian (pulp) novels were written by women, and were also good enough to becoming underground classics...The pulps also reached isolated, small-town lesbians who could read them and see that they were not the only lesbians in the world."

Ann Bannon

Ann Bannon (Ann Weldy b. 1932) wrote six lesbian themed pulp novels from 1957 to 1962 that later became known as The Beebo Brinker Chronicles. The popularity of the books as well as the continuity of characters gave them a remarkable longevity and earned her the title, "Queen of Lesbian Pulp Fiction." Her books were re-released in 1983 and again in 2001.

Bannon wrote: Odd Girl Out, 1957 Gold Medal Books; I Am a Woman, 1959 Gold Medal Books; Women in the Shadows, 1959 Gold Medal Books; Journey to a Woman, 1960 Gold Medal Books; The Marriage, 1960 Gold Medal Books; Beebo Brinker, 1962 Gold Medal Books.

Valerie Taylor

Valerie Taylor  (Velma Nacella Young 1913–1997) wrote eight lesbian themed novels from 1957–1964, poetry that was published in The Ladder, and several novels in the 1970s through Naiad Press. She became a gay activist, co-founding the Mattachine Society and the Lesbian Writers' Conference in Chicago in 1974.

Taylor wrote: Whisper Their Love, 1957 Gold Medal Books; The Girls in 3-B, 1959 Gold Medal Books; Stranger on Lesbos, 1960 Gold Medal Books; A World Without Men, 1963 Midwood-Tower; Unlike Others, 1963 Midwood-Tower; Journey to Fulfillment, 1964 Midwood-Tower.

According to scholar Lisa Walker, "she is best remembered as one of a few authors of pro-lesbian pulp fiction from the 1950s and 1960s."

Marijane Meaker

Marijane Meaker (born 1927) wrote under the pen names of Vin Packer and Ann Aldrich, as well as serving as a copy-editor for Gold Medal Books. Packer's books were generally mystery novels, but using her Ann Aldrich name she wrote nonfiction books about lesbians that were not overly sympathetic about lesbianism and earned Meaker the ire of the Daughters of Bilitis printed in The Ladder. Barbara Grier once referred to her as "the evil genius." Meaker later wrote books for young adults under the names M. E. Kerr and Mary James.

Meaker wrote: Spring Fire, 1952 Gold Medal Books; We Walk Alone, 1955 Gold Medal Books; We, Too, Must Love, 1958 Gold Medal Books; Carol in a Thousand Cities, 1960 Gold Medal Books; We Two Won't Last, 1963 Gold Medal Books; Take a Lesbian to Lunch, 1972.

Marion Zimmer Bradley

Marion Zimmer Bradley (1930–1999) wrote under various pen names, eventually becoming quite popular for her Avalon and Darkover series. For years Bradley refused to admit she authored her early paperback lesbian fiction, and was reluctant to publicly speak about her work on The Ladder.

Bradley wrote: I Am a Lesbian, 1962 as Lee Chapman; No Adam for Eve, 1966 as John Dexter; My Sister, My Love, 1963 as Miriam Gardner; Twilight Lovers, 1964 as Miriam Gardner; The Strange Women, 1967 as Miriam Gardner; Spare Her Heaven, 1963 as Morgan Ives;
Anything Goes, 1964 as Morgan Ives; Knives of Desire, 1966 as Morgan Ives.

Artemis Smith

Annselm L.N.V. Morpurgo  (1934 -    ) also known as the founder of the 1950s Unisex Movement, wrote under various pen names, including Carle for ONE Magazine, as well as under A.S. Morpurgo, Diana Carleton Rhodes, Artemis Smith, and presently also under Artemis Smith, Grandma MoseX, and Annselm LNVM. She further collaborated in the arts with her life-partner Billie Ann Taulman (1929-2008), known to The Ladder as Billie Bruce, whose iconic sketch of Artemis Smith was published on one of the magazine's covers. Taulman wrote one of the chapters in Artemis Smith's The Third Sex and is now credited in re-issues, which also contain numerous scientific papers on the nature of self-consciousness and gender identity, written by Smith as a professional bioepistemologist. In her 1960s addresses to East Coast homophile organizations meetings in Philadelphia, Artemis Smith originated the "come out of the closet" slogan and strategy for linking the gay rights movement to other rights movements in which, as both novelist and playwright, she was also a spokeswoman.

Smith's Odd Girl and The Third Sex were published by Beacon Books in 1959 after multiple rejections by major publishers. Unlike former pulp novels, these also contained strong political statements that influenced the formation of the gay rights movements of the late 1950s. Originally titled Anne Loves Beth, Odd Girl was extensively blue-penciled by the pulp editors. The original version has recently been reissued by the author through 'the savant garde workshop', a service press for The Savant Garde Institute, which also continues to publish her many collected papers, plays, novels, and poetry.  Her most important artistic work, Testament of Sarah (Book I of The SKEETS Triptych. 1967), was originally to be published by Doubleday & Co.

Under classic pulp fiction, Artemis Smith wrote: The Third Sex, 1959 Beacon Books; Odd Girl, 1959 Beacon Books; This Bed We Made, 1961 Monarch Books.

Pro-lesbian pulp fiction 
Literary scholar Yvonne Keller recognizes a small group of writers whose work formed the subgenre of "pro-lesbian" pulp fiction, including Bannon, Meaker, Smith, Taylor, as well as Sloane Britain, Paula Christian, Joan Ellis, March Hastings, Marjorie Lee, Della Martin, Rea Michaels, Claire Morgan, Randy Salem, and Shirley Verel. According to Keller the subgenre includes approximately 100 novels whose authors, often lesbians themselves, refused to acknowledge the conventional voyeurism of the rest of the genre.

Cover art

Lesbian pulp novels typically had lurid, titillating cover art. Although many women (lesbian and otherwise) bought and read these novels, book publishers marketed them to men as erotic fantasy. Covers might have a few provocative lines of text meant to draw attention to the sexy and scandalous nature of what was between the covers. Publishers inserted words such as "twilight", "odd", "strange", "shadows", and "queer" in the titles of these books. Author Ann Bannon has stated that men would read the covers literally, attracted to the art of half-dressed women in a bedroom scene, and women would read the covers iconically: two women looking at each other, or one woman standing, another on a bed, with the trigger words of "strange" or "twilight" meaning that the book had lesbian content in it.

Bannon was appalled by the covers that Fawcett provided for her Beebo Brinker Chronicles. Melissa Sky argues that there was a definitive type for these covers that often displayed illustrations that did not correspond to the material inside. Additionally, the covers of lesbian pulp novels often presented lesbian relationships as dangerous and questioned whether lesbians could really be seen as women, exposing deeper anxieties about the stability of the gender and sexual norms of the 1950s.

Furthermore, the covers often included blurbs on both the front and the back that emphasized the message of the illustration. These blurbs would praise the authors for their bravery in addressing their subject with honesty. They also portrayed the content of the novels as scandalous and sensational, and made it clear that the reader would find sex scenes inside. Additionally, some blurbs were written by doctors, who would recommend the books on the basis of their value as case studies, suggesting that people would read the novels for their educational value and demonstrating the way in which lesbianism was pathologized at the time.

Decline and republishing
In 1964, Desert of the Heart by Jane Rule (loosely adapted as the 1985 film Desert Hearts) and Mrs. Stevens Hears the Mermaids Singing by May Sarton in 1965 were published by mainstream publishers in hardback, both enjoying a fairly successful run. Patience and Sarah (originally self-published by author Alma Routsong in 1969) is considered the first novel to initiate a feminist publishing run. In 1973, Naiad Press was founded by Barbara Grier which concentrated mainly on lesbian-themed books. The growth of the pornographic industry after a series of United States Supreme Court decisions disallowing the censorship of pornographic material, was evident in books that served to be more graphic in nature than focusing on the relationships of the women in the stories, which also led to the decline of lesbian pulp fiction. Authors March Hastings and Paula Christian both stated their publishers lost interest in their subject in the mid-1960s. As well, common plot points in the books involved women who were coming to terms with realizing their attraction to women in a world that did not allow it. With the rise of feminism, and the gay rights movement in 1969, these plot points were decreasingly relevant.

However, certain lesbian pulp novels, including Ann Bannon's books, were reprinted in the 1980s by Naiad Press with the goal of bringing lesbian authors to light. Naiad provided new covers for the books, for example portraying silhouettes of lesbian couples on the covers of Bannon's novels. Melissa Sky argues that, due to the political motivations of Naiad Press, "the cover art betrays a feminist ambivalence towards the kinds of non-egalitarian relationships depicted in Bannon's series," specifically the butch-femme relationships that were often central to lesbian bar culture of the 1950s. In the early 2000s, the queer publisher Cleis Press again republished Bannon's novels, this time with covers in the style of 1950s pulp covers. Although the cover illustrations were taken from real pulp novels, they were not the original covers of the Beebo Brinker Chronicles. Sky argues that the Cleis versions emphasize the camp quality of lesbian pulp.  In 2005, an anthology titled Lesbian Pulp Fiction was published by Katherine Forrest. Forrest's forward provides further information on the genre and history.

Patricia Highsmith's The Price of Salt was adapted into the 2015 film Carol by Phyllis Nagy and directed by Todd Haynes. Starring Cate Blanchett and Rooney Mara, it received numerous accolades, bringing a 1950s lesbian "pulp story" to a wider modern audience.

Reemergence of lesbian pop fiction

In much the same way as publication of the 1950s/1960s pulp novels was made possible by new technology, another wave of lesbian literature came into existence due to the new technologies of the 1980s to the present. In the 1980s and 1990s, lesbian fan fiction surged to the forefront with hundreds of authors writing stories, novels, and whole series and making them available online via the Internet. This online publication continues to be popular to this day. In the 2000s, with increased availability of the internet and awareness of the genre, authorship grew into the tens of thousands. Many of the authors who wrote in the 1980s and 1990s gravitated away from fan fiction and began to write original works, and small presses sprang up to publish that work. With the proliferation of offset printing and the subsequent widespread availability of print on demand technology and desktop publishing, for the first time in history, small presses with little capital began to regularly publish lesbian voices. By the turn of the 21st century, over a dozen lesbian fiction and nonfiction publishers had emerged, and they are successfully marketing hundreds of new titles yearly for the lesbian audience. The three largest publishers going into this new millennium are Bella Books, Bold Strokes Books, and Regal Crest Enterprises.

The development of electronic E-books has made it possible for out-of-print books to be made available again. Many pulp novels have been reissued in e-book form, and most print books published today are also issued as e-books.

See also

Gay pulp fiction
IHLIA LGBT Heritage (owns a large collection of 1950–1960 lesbian pulp fiction)
List of lesbian fiction
Yuri

References

Further reading 

 Bryan, Dan (January 10, 2013).  Lesbian Pulp Fiction — the 1950s Phenomenon. American History USA.
 Carolyn (August 15, 2011).  You Probably Want to Read Some Lesbian Pulp Fiction. Autostraddle.
 Gianoulis, Tina (May 13, 2006). Romance Novels. glbtq: An Encyclopedia of Gay, Lesbian, Bisexual, Transgender, and Queer Culture. (archive)
 Hiott-Millis, Lily (September 18, 2013). Peek Inside 22 Vintage Lesbian Pulp Novels. BuzzFeed.
 Irwin, Rebekah (February 23, 2009).  Room 26 Cabinet of Curiosities: Lesbian Pulp Novels, 19(50)-1965. Beinecke Rare Book & Manuscript Library. Yale University Library. Yale University.
 Maguire, Robert A.  R.A. Maguire Cover Art. (Website of pulp fiction covers illustrator/artist.)
 
 Nice Girl Films (2015). The Chanticleer . (Web series inspired by 1950s lesbian pulp fiction.)
 Parks, Joy.  (June 26, 2005). Stories of Forbidden Passion ... They Dared to Read!. San Francisco Chronicle.

External links

 Sally Taft Duplaix Collection at the Mortimer Rare Book Collection, Smith College Special Collections
 Lesbian Pulp Novels at Beinecke Rare Book & Manuscript Library, Yale University Library, Yale University
  Guide to the Gay and Lesbian Pulp Fiction Collection 1955-1988 at Fales Library and Special Collections, New York University
 Lesbian Pulp Fiction Collection at Mount Saint Vincent University
 Lesbian Pulp Fiction at Duke University Libraries
 Valerie Taylor Papers at Cornell University Library
 Strange Sisters (an archive of) Lesbian Paperback Artwork from the 50s and 60s. strangesisters.com (Ryan Richardson) 
 Paperback Classics. Cleis Press (archive)

20th century in LGBT history
20th-century literature
Pulp fiction
Lesbian erotica
Lesbian fiction
Lesbian history